West Bound Limited is a 1937 American action film directed by Ford Beebe and starring Lyle Talbot, Polly Rowles, Frank Reicher, Henry Brandon, Henry Hunter and William Lundigan. Written by Maurice Geraghty, the film was released on July 11, 1937, by Universal Pictures. The film was recorded at various locations along the South Pacific Coast Railroad in Santa Cruz County, California.

Plot
Night-dispatcher Dave Tolliver is found guilty of negligence after not changing the tracks for a passenger train, when trying to stop a masked robber, he later escapes prison and goes cover for a dispatcher that has fallen ill, then he founds out that the robber works in that station.

Cast
Lyle Talbot as Dave Tolliver aka Bob Kirk
Polly Rowles as Janet Martin
Frank Reicher as Pop Martin
Henry Brandon as Joe Forbes
Henry Hunter as Howard
William Lundigan as Dispatcher

References

External links
 

1937 films
American action films
1930s action films
Universal Pictures films
Films directed by Ford Beebe
American black-and-white films
1930s English-language films
1930s American films